Diplazoptilon is a genus of flowering plants in the daisy family.

 Species
 Diplazoptilon cooperi (J.Anthony) C.Shih - Tibet, Bhutan, Arunachal Pradesh
 Diplazoptilon picridifolium (Hand.-Mazz.) Ling - Yunnan, Tibet

References

Cynareae
Asteraceae genera